Ulice jak stygmaty – Pidzama Porno's first album. Released in 1989. It was recorded at Ośrodek Kultury "Słońce" in Poznań.

Track listing

The band
 Krzysztof "Grabaż" Grabowski - vocal
 Ropuch - guitar
 Andrzej "Kozak" Kozakiewicz - bass guitar, vocal
 Rafał "Kuzyn" Piotrowiak - drums
 Filary - keyboard

References
Album info on the official site (pl)
The original "Ulice jak Stygmaty" can be downloaded on the band's official site

Pidżama Porno albums
1989 debut albums